Henley Harbour is a ghost town in the Canadian province of Newfoundland and Labrador. It is located on the south coast of Labrador.

References

Ghost towns in Newfoundland and Labrador